Norias de Ojocaliente is an inhabited place around an ejido in the state of Aguascalientes. It is located 5 miles east of the city of Aguascalientes and has a population of 3,741.

External links

References

Populated places in Aguascalientes